Ivohibe is a district in south-eastern Madagascar. It is a part of Ihorombe Region and borders the districts of Ambalavao in north, Vondrozo in east, Midongy Sud in south, Iakora in southwest and Ihosy in west.

Communes
The district is further divided into six communes:

 Antambohobe
 Ivongo
 Ivohibe
 Maropaika
 Antaramena
 Kotipa

It is connected with Ihosy in the west, and Farafangana in the east by the largely unpaved Route nationale 27.

References and notes

Districts of Ihorombe